The C.F. Haynsworth Federal Building and United States Courthouse, formerly known as the U.S. Post Office and Courthouse, is a historic civic building at 300 East Washington Street in Greenville, South Carolina.  It is named for jurist Clement Haynsworth.  It is a three-story building, clad in limestone with granite trim, resting on a brick foundation.  It was designed by Eric Kebbon and built in 1937 with funding from the federal Public Works Administration, and was designed to house the local post office and federal court facilities.  It continues to perform these functions, also housing other federal offices.

The building was listed on the National Register of Historic Places in 2014.

See also
National Register of Historic Places listings in Greenville, South Carolina

References

External links

Federal buildings in the United States
National Register of Historic Places in Greenville, South Carolina
Government buildings on the National Register of Historic Places in South Carolina